is a Japanese manga series written and illustrated by Yuto Sano. It has been serialized in Shueisha's shōnen manga magazine Jump Square since July 2022.

Publication
Written and illustrated by Yuto Sano, Gokurakugai was preceded by a one-shot chapter, titled , published in Shueisha's shōnen manga magazine Jump SQ.Rise on January 27, 2020; the serialization started in Shueisha's Jump Square on July 4, 2022. Shueisha released the first tankōbon volume on November 4, 2022.

Viz Media started publishing the manga digitally in English, with its first six chapters, on March 2, 2023.

Volume list

References

External links
  
 

Shōnen manga
Shueisha manga
Viz Media manga